General John Regan is a 1933 British comedy film directed by Henry Edwards and starring Edwards, Chrissie White and Ben Welden. It is an adaptation of the 1913 play General John Regan by George A. Birmingham. It was a quota film made at British and Dominion Studios, Elstree, for release by Paramount.

Cast
 Henry Edwards as Dr. O'Grady
 Chrissie White as Moya Kent
 Ben Welden as Billing
 Pegeen Mair as Mary Ellen
 David Horne as Major Kent
 W.G. Fay as Golligher
 Fred O'Donovan as Doyle
 Denis O'Neil as Kerrigan
 Eugene Leahy as Sergeant Colgan
 George Callaghan as Moriarty
 Mary O'Farrell as Mrs. Gregg

See also
 General John Regan (1921)

References

Bibliography
 Chibnall, Steve. Quota Quickies: The Birth of the British 'B' Film. British Film Institute, 2007.

External links

1933 films
1933 comedy films
British films based on plays
Films set in Ireland
Films directed by Henry Edwards
British comedy films
Quota quickies
British black-and-white films
Remakes of British films
Sound film remakes of silent films
British and Dominions Studios films
Films shot at Imperial Studios, Elstree
1930s English-language films
1930s British films